The 2014 Open Castilla y León was a professional tennis tournament played on hard courts. It was the 29th edition of the tournament which was part of the 2014 ATP Challenger Tour. It took place in Segovia, Spain between 28 July and 3 August 2014.

ATP entrants

Seeds

 1 Rankings are as of July 21, 2014.

Other entrants
The following players received wildcards into the singles main draw:
  Alejandro Augusto Bueno
  Antonio Cembellin
  Cristian Garín
  Jorge Hernando Ruano

The following players received entry from the qualifying draw:
  Brydan Klein
  Florent Serra
  Frederico Ferreira Silva
  Chuhan Wang

Champions

Singles

 Adrian Mannarino def.  Adrián Menéndez Maceiras 6–3, 6–0

Doubles

 Victor Baluda /  Alexander Kudryavtsev def.  Brydan Klein /  Nikola Mektić 6–2, 4–6, [10–3]

External links
Official Website
ITF Search
ATP official site

 
Castilla
Castilla y Leon
Open Castilla y Leon
Open Castilla y Leon
Open Castilla y León